Kota Tinggi Bypass, Federal Route 3, AH18, is a major highway bypass in Kota Tinggi District, Johor, Malaysia. It incorporates the second bridge of Kota Tinggi which crosses the Sungai Johor. The main purpose of the construction of this bypass is to reduce traffic congestion at the main bridge of Kota Tinggi town centre.

List of junctions and towns 

Highways in Malaysia